Kent & Curwen is a British menswear retailer, founded in 1926 in London by Eric Kent and Dorothy Curwen. Kent & Curwen first made its name supplying ties to universities in Oxford and Cambridge. The brand went on to introduce a cricket sweater in the 1930s.

The Three Lions Herald trademark was registered in 1982.

Kent & Curwen is now owned by the Hong Kong conglomerate Trinity Ltd who were put into liquidation in January 2021.

History 

1926 - Eric Kent and Dorothy Curwen established E.W Kent & Curwen in London. They began as a manufacturer of regimental, club and college ties, supplying Oxford and Cambridge universities.
October 1931 - Eric proposed to Dorothy whilst travelling through Europe. They married the following year
1932 - The company bought a knitwear factory in London to manufacture its first cricket jumpers. In the 1930s, E.W Kent & Curwen dressed the Hollywood Cricket team.

23 June 1937 - E.W Kent & Curwen was registered as a limited company becoming simply Kent & Curwen Ltd., trading on Silver Street in the City of London.
12 February 1939 - Eric Kent died suddenly, aged just 46.
1940s - Kent & Curwen moved from Silver Street during WWI due to bomb damage, to Warwick Street in the West End.
18 December 1972 - Dorothy died at her home on Sussex Coast.
1973 - Kent & Curwen moved from Warwick Street to a leasehold premise on Domingo Street.
1975 - Jane Bourvis joined the company, eventually becoming the Director for Knitwear Sales and Design.

Early 1980s - Kent & Curwen opened their own store at 39 St. James’ Street, close to Piccadilly Circus. They also became the costumes sponsor of the Oscar winning film Chariots of Fire.
December 1982 - Kent & Curwen was taken over by a Swiss trading company called Giselle. Through this merger, the company was introduced to the Japanese company, D'Urban, with whom a trading agreement was formed.
Mid 1980s - Kent & Curwen began to explore the export market, exhibiting at trade shows in New York and Paris. In 1986, they opened on Rodeo Drive, Beverly Hills. In Asia, Kent & Curwen opened across Singapore and Hong Kong.

 1990s - Tie manufacture was down.
2000s - Moving into the 21st century, each of the stores closed in quick succession, including the St. James store in 2002, leaving Kent & Curwen no obvious retail presence.
2006 - Kent & Curwen opened a new flagship store on Conduit Street.
 2008 - Kent & Curwen acquired by Trinity Limited of Li & Fung Group with headquarter in Hong Kong.
 February 2010 - Kent & Curwen opened a new shop at No. 2, Piccadilly Arcade.
 2015 - Kent & Curwen started a 5-year global business partnership with David Beckham.
 2016 - Kent & Curwen appointed Daniel Kearns as Creative Director.
 2017 - They opened a second London shop at Covent Garden.

Collaborations and Sponsorship 

Uniforms Sponsorship of Hong Kong's representatives for Olympic and Asian Games

Kent & Curwen was the official uniforms supplier of Hong Kong’s representatives for the London Olympic Games in 2012. Kent & Curwen's designs included white knit jacket and casual polo shirts.

At the 17th Asian Games at Incheon in 2014 Kent & Curwen were the official uniforms supplier for the Hong Kong representative.

Business Partnership with David Beckham

Kent & Curwen announced a 5-year partnership with David Beckham in September 2015.

Daniel Kearns was appointed in February 2016 to oversee all collections, including the partnership with David Beckham.

Other

 Kent & Curwen has sponsored the “Kent & Curwen Centenary Sprint Cup” since 2010 
 In 2012, they sponsored a charity cricket match in support of British servicemen through the charities Help for Heroes and Walking with the Wounded.
 They were the sponsor of The Kent & Curwen Royal Charity Polo Cup between 2012 and 2014.
 In January 2019, Kent & Curwen launched a collection produced in collaboration with the BBC TV show Peaky Blinders, which included frock coats, tailored suits, and the flat cap featured in the television show.
 In 2019, David Shrigley created motifs and statements to fit with the brand's style. The collaboration included sweatshirts, T-shirts and accessories.

Stores 

As of March 2020, Kent & Curwen has 83 stores in 29 cities.

References 

Suit makers
Savile Row Bespoke Association members
British brands